Archie Hughes (born 14 February 2003) is a Welsh rugby union player, currently playing for United Rugby Championship and European Rugby Champions Cup side Scarlets. His preferred position is scrum-half.

Professional career
Hughes played junior club rugby for Tenby RFC, and attended Llandovery College. A member of the Scarlets Academy, Hughes played for Scarlets U16 and U18. Hughes made his first appearance for the Scarlets on 4 September 2021, in a preseason friendly against Nottingham, scoring two tries as a substitute. 

Hughes was named in the Scarlets squad for the 2021–22 season.

In 2022, Hughes was called into the Wales U20 team, starting against Scotland in the 2022 Six Nations Under 20s Championship. The following year, he was selected again for the U20 side for the 2023 Six Nations Under 20s Championship.

In addition to his playing career, Hughes studies at Swansea University.

References

External links
 Itsrugby.co.uk Profile

Living people
Welsh rugby union players
Scarlets players
Rugby union scrum-halves
Rugby union players from Haverfordwest
2003 births